Moros is the personification of impending doom and destruction in Greek mythology.

Moros may also refer to:

Moros (Stargate), a character in the TV series Stargate SG-1 and Stargate Atlantis
Moors in Spanish, applied by the Spanish to the Muslims they found in the Philippines
 Moros (Philippines)
 Moro National Liberation Front
Moros y Cristianos, the Cuban version of beans and rice
 Moros, Spain, a municipality in the Spanish province of Zaragoza
 Moros, home planet of Keill Randor in The Last Legionary series of young adult science fiction novels
 In the massively multiplayer online game EVE Online there is a class of dreadnought capital ship named after Moros.
 In the massively multiplayer online role-playing game World of Warcraft, there is a boss mob named after Moros. His name is Moroes, the Tower Steward of Karazhan.
 In the White Wolf RPG Mage: the Awakening, the Moros are a path of Mages dealing especially with Death and Matter. 
 Moros intrepidus, a species of small tyrannosauroid dinosaur from North America

People with the surname
Carlos Moros (born 1993), Spanish professional footballer
Cristina Moros (born 1977), American former professional tennis player
Helen Moros (1967–2003), New Zealand long-distance runner
Nicolás Maduro Moros (born 1962), president of Venezuela
Rebecca Moros (born 1985), American women's soccer player